Elazığ Belediyespor was a Turkish sports club from Elazığ,  Turkey.

The club played in blue and black kits, and did so since their formation in 1989.

Stadium
The team played at the 14,000-seat capacity Elazığ Atatürk Stadium.

League participations
TFF Third League: 1997–2002, 2011–2014
Turkish Regional Amateur League: 1989–1997, 2002–2011

References

External links
Ela\ig.bel.tr
Mackolik.com

Football clubs in Turkey
1989 establishments in Turkey